Rupsa is an upazila of Khulna District in the Division of Khulna, Bangladesh.

Geography
It has 27774 households and total area 120.15 km2.

Demographics
According to the 1991 Bangladesh census, Rupsa had a population of 150,185. Males constituted 51.98% of the population and females 48.02%. The population aged 18 or over was 77,918. Rupsa had an average literacy rate of 40.4% (7+ years), compared to the national average of 32.4%.

Administration
Rupsa Upazila is divided into five union parishads: Aichgati, Ghatvog, Noihati, Srifoltola, and T. S. Bahirdia. The union parishads are subdivided into 64 mauzas and 78 villages.

History

The southern part of Bengal is known as the Gangetic Peninsula. Multiple rivers have transformed the entire land mass into numerous islands and peninsulas. Due to various natural ups and downs and tides, the river has broken, the land has been flooded, and new land has been created. At that time, the name of this southern island region was Chandra Deep. The island was divided into various subdivisions. East of Chandradwip, most of Bagerhat's territory extended to Rangdwip (Rangdia) and Madhudeep (Madhudia). The current Rupsa Upazila was attached to this peninsula. The entire region was part of the Sundarbans.

The history of Rupsa Upazila and Khulna is closely related to Bhairab river. In fact, Khulna's journey as a business center is centered around Bhairav. Bhairav ​​is the longest river in the south. Once there was a terrible statue of this river. Avon that Tandava Rupas is no more. Bhairava originates from this rupasa. Bhairava begins on the opposite side of where the Shrutkirti river flows through Maldah into the Padma. After some distance it merges with Jalangi river and then becomes free again and comes to Khulna through Meherpur, Darshana, Kotchandpur and Jessore. Left Sen's market and wandered east. On the other hand, Pasur river in the south extends to the east bank of Khulna. A canal mentioned from Bill Pabla in the west joins the Mayur river (Mayarganga) in the south.

See also
Upazilas of Bangladesh
Districts of Bangladesh
Divisions of Bangladesh

References

Upazilas of Khulna District
Khulna Division